

Day 1 (29 August)
Top American Mardy Fish opened proceedings cruising past German Tobias Kamke 6–2, 6–2, 6–1. While, another American Ryan Harrison fell to 27th seed Marin Čilić 6–2, 7–5, 7–6(8–6), after wasting leads in the second and third set. No. 13 seed Richard Gasquet then played the inaugural match at the newest show court, Court 17, defeating Sergiy Stakhovsky in straight sets 6–4, 6–4, 6–0. Five-time champion and 3rd seed Roger Federer defeated Santiago Giraldo 6–4, 6–3, 6–2. Other seeds who cruised through were Gaël Monfils, Tomáš Berdych, Alexandr Dolgopolov, Radek Štěpánek and Janko Tipsarević. While 15th seed Viktor Troicki and 29th seed Michaël Llodra, were both pushed to a final set with Llodra prevailing over Victor Hănescu, while Troicki was the first upset of the tournament losing to Alejandro Falla.

On the women's side former champion Maria Sharapova was pushed by Britain's Heather Watson in three sets 3–6, 7–5, 6–3. While, the American woman had mixed results, out of 8 on court 4 of them being led by 2-time champion Venus Williams, Madison Keys, Irina Falconi, and Christina McHale.  Most of the top seeds also advanced to the second round, led by last year's finalist and 2nd seed Vera Zvonareva, the Russian was joined by Marion Bartoli, Samantha Stosur, Agnieszka Radwańska, Peng Shuai and Dominika Cibulková. The major upset of the opening day saw Wimbledon Champion Petra Kvitová as she fell to Alexandra Dulgheru in straight sets 7–6(7–3), 6–3, hitting 52 unforced errors. This also marks the first time in the Open Era that a reigning Wimbledon Champion has lost in the first round of the US Open.
 Schedule of Play
Seeds out:
 Men's Singles:  Viktor Troicki [15]
 Women's Singles:  Petra Kvitová [5]

Day 2 (30 August)
 Schedule of Play
Seeds out:
 Men's Singles:  Mikhail Youzhny [16],  Ivan Dodig [32]
 Women's Singles:  Li Na [6],  Daniela Hantuchová [21],  María José Martínez Sánchez [32]

Day 3 (31 August)
 Schedule of Play
Seeds out:
 Men's Singles:  Nicolás Almagro [10]
 Women's Singles:  Marion Bartoli [8],  Agnieszka Radwańska [12],  Dominika Cibulková [14],  Yanina Wickmayer [20]
 Men's Doubles:  Bob Bryan /  Mike Bryan [1],  František Čermák /  Filip Polášek [11],  Scott Lipsky /  Rajeev Ram [16]
 Women's Doubles:  Chan Yung-jan /  Anastasia Rodionova [10],  Chuang Chia-jung /  Olga Govortsova [13]

Day 4 (1 September)
 Schedule of Play
Seeds out:
 Men's Singles:  Gaël Monfils [7],  Richard Gasquet [13],  Radek Štěpánek [23],  Michaël Llodra [29]
 Women's Singles:  Shahar Pe'er [23],  Jarmila Gajdošová [29],  Kaia Kanepi [31]
 Men's Doubles:  Christopher Kas /  Alexander Peya [10]
 Women's Doubles:  Peng Shuai /  Zheng Jie [7],  Natalie Grandin /  Vladimíra Uhlířová [11]
 Mixed Doubles:  Yaroslava Shvedova /  Max Mirnyi [3],  Sania Mirza /  Mahesh Bhupathi [6]

Day 5 (2 September)
 Schedule of Play
Seeds out:
 Men's Singles:   Stanislas Wawrinka [14],  Jürgen Melzer [17],  Ivan Ljubičić [30]
 Women's Singles:  Maria Sharapova [3],  Julia Görges [19],  Nadia Petrova [24],  Lucie Šafářová [27],  Anabel Medina Garrigues [30]
 Men's Doubles:  Max Mirnyi /  Daniel Nestor [2],  Marcelo Melo /  Bruno Soares [12]
 Women's Doubles:  Nuria Llagostera Vives /  Arantxa Parra Santonja [14]
 Mixed Doubles:  Vania King /  Rohan Bopanna [5]

Day 6 (3 September)
 Schedule of Play
Seeds out:
 Men's Singles:  Tomáš Berdych [9],  Fernando Verdasco [19],  Marin Čilić [27],  Marcel Granollers [31]
 Women's Singles:  Victoria Azarenka [4],  Jelena Janković [11],  Roberta Vinci [18]
 Men's Doubles:  Eric Butorac /  Jean-Julien Rojer [8],  Juan Ignacio Chela /  Eduardo Schwank [14]
 Mixed Doubles:  Liezel Huber /  Bob Bryan [1],  Katarina Srebotnik /  Daniel Nestor [2]

Day 7 (4 September)
 Schedule of Play
Seeds out:
 Men's Singles:  Juan Martín del Potro [18],  Juan Ignacio Chela [24],  Feliciano López [25],  Florian Mayer [26]
 Women's Singles:  Peng Shuai [13],  Sabine Lisicki [22],  Maria Kirilenko [25]
 Men's Doubles:  Marcel Granollers /  Marc López [13] (withdrew),  Mark Knowles /  Xavier Malisse [15]
 Women's Doubles:  Sania Mirza /  Elena Vesnina [6],  Jarmila Gajdošová /  Bethanie Mattek-Sands [16]

Day 8 (5 September)
 Schedule of Play
Seeds out:
 Men's Singles:  Mardy Fish [8],  Alexandr Dolgopolov [22]
 Women's Singles:  Francesca Schiavone [7],  Svetlana Kuznetsova [15],  Ana Ivanovic [16]
 Men's Doubles:  Michaël Llodra /  Nenad Zimonjić [3]
 Women's Doubles:  Gisela Dulko /  Flavia Pennetta [2],  María José Martínez Sánchez /  Anabel Medina Garrigues [12]

Day 9 (6 September) 
All the matches that should have been played this day were postponed due to the continued rain.
 Schedule of Play

Day 10 (7 September)
Due to the rainy weather forecast, the Day 10 day and night sessions have been cancelled. Play will resume on Day 11 (8 September), weather permitting.
 Schedule of Play

Day 11 (8 September)
 Schedule of Play
Seeds out:
 Men's Singles:  David Ferrer [5],  Jo-Wilfried Tsonga [11],  Gilles Simon [12],  Janko Tipsarević [20]
 Women's Singles:  Vera Zvonareva [2],  Andrea Petkovic [10],  Anastasia Pavlyuchenkova [17],  Flavia Pennetta [26]
 Men's Doubles:  Mahesh Bhupathi /  Leander Paes [4],  Robert Lindstedt /  Horia Tecău [7]
 Women's Doubles:  Květa Peschke /  Katarina Srebotnik [1],  Andrea Hlaváčková /  Lucie Hradecká [8],  Iveta Benešová /  Barbora Záhlavová-Strýcová [9],  Sara Errani /  Roberta Vinci [15]
 Mixed Doubles:  Elena Vesnina /  Leander Paes [7]

Day 12 (9 September)
 Schedule of Play
Seeds out:
 Men's Singles:  John Isner [28],  Andy Roddick [21]
 Men's Doubles:  Rohan Bopanna /  Aisam-ul-Haq Qureshi [5]
 Women's Doubles:   Maria Kirilenko /  Nadia Petrova [5]
 Mixed Doubles:  Gisela Dulko /  Eduardo Schwank [8]

Day 13 (10 September)
 Schedule of Play
Seeds out:
 Men's Singles:  Roger Federer [3],  Andy Murray [4]
 Women's Singles:  Caroline Wozniacki [1]
 Men's Doubles:  Mariusz Fyrstenberg /  Marcin Matkowski [6]

Day 14 (11 September)
In remembrance of the September 11 attacks, the United States Tennis Association (USTA) and the US Open have, among other things, painted the digits "9/11/01" on Arthur Ashe Stadium two days in advance of Day 14's scheduled women's final. The players at the US Open have also been given a white US Open cap with the digits "9/11/01" in black block figures on the side of the cap. For the men's final originally scheduled for 11 September, the USTA had planned for the finalists to walk through a path lined by an honor guard of New York police officers, firefighters, and Port Authority police. The USTA also had planned for the men's final a moment of silence, a military flyover, and the unfurling of a court-sized US flag at Arthur Ashe Stadium, and these events were remain as part of the women's final. Cyndi Lauper contributed by singing the national anthem at the Williams–Wozniacki semifinal match on 10 September, and Queen Latifah did the same at the women's final, the Williams–Stosur match.
 Schedule of Play
Seeds out:
 Women's Singles:  Serena Williams [28]
 Women's Doubles:  Vania King [3] /  Yaroslava Shvedova [3]

Day 15 (12 September)
 Schedule of Play
Seeds out:
 Men's Singles:  Rafael Nadal [2]

References

Day-by-day summaries
US Open (tennis) by year – Day-by-day summaries